Salvia nilotica is a perennial shrub growing in the eastern African highlands from Ethiopia to Zimbabwe, between  elevation. The small flowers, in whorls of 6–8, range from purple to rose to white.

Notes

nilotica
Flora of Ethiopia
Flora of Zimbabwe
Plants described in 1776
Taxa named by Nikolaus Joseph von Jacquin